Dejavu di Kinabalu is a Malaysian television drama which is airing from Monday to Thursday on TV3 in the Akasia slot. It is being aired from June 18, 2012, to July 31, 2012. This drama is directed by Erma Fatima & Fazli Yahya (mostly by Fazli Yahya) and starring Tiz Zaqyah, Aqasha, Nazim Othman and Aishah Ilias.

The drama is a remake-adaptation of popular Korean drama "Summer Scent" with some story lines (the ending) were altered.

Plot
Ammar (Aqasha) could still feel loss and emptiness in his heart even though his beloved girlfriend died three years ago. Could this be a coincidence or fate, when he met Nadira (Tiz Zaqyah), who has the same characteristics as his late girlfriend? The sudden feeling of deja vu he felt every time they met has created a special bond between Ammar and Nadira.

Nadira's life changed after a heart transplant, without realizing she also received the donor's 'properties'. Nadira to find the fate of Ammar, boyfriend to the heart donor. The first meeting at the airport between Ammar who had just returned from Australia with Nadira to be holidaying in Kundasang, Sabah has brought a thousand and one stories.

Nadira's feet was hurt in the rush to meet her friend, Yusra (Sharifah Nadia Yusnita). She fell in front of Ammar. Ammar decided to help Nadira wrapped her hurt feet and bought her a new shoes. When he was there with Nadira, he felt a sense of feeling that was difficult to explain..

Ammar and Nadira met again in the same plane heading to Kundasang Sabah. Ammar returned to Malaysia to help a friend of his, Zahir (Meor Mohd), an interior designing company owner who was to conduct a project in Sabah. Ammar himself was unsure whether he returned with a new soul or Inara (Aishah Ilias) is still strongly entrenched in his heart. Kundasang, Sabah was the place where Ammar and Inara fell in love and it was also a place where she was buried. Love was too beautiful for Ammar and it was not easy for him to forget Inara.

To be sure the meeting between Ammar and Nadira brought an extraordinary sense of deja vu. Ammar never wanted to love anyone else, even though Inara had died three years ago. For Ammar, Inara is his first and last love. Ammar and Nadira met again in Kundasang when Nadira who kept taking pictures fell into the gorge. They both failed to rise to the top because it was already late afternoon and had an overnight stay.

After returning to Kuala Lumpur, Nadira and Ammar met again. They had to work together on a renovation project conducted by Bazli (Nazim Othman). Bazli is the manager of the Villa Hotel, a family business who is also Nadira's fiance. Nadira and Ammar met regularly for work routine. They became friends fast because of many similarities in the discussions for the project. Ammar failed to control his feelings and poured out his heart to Nadira. Nadira's sister, Uzma (Rebecca Nur Al Islam), who fancied Ammar, knew the connection between Ammar's late girlfriend and her sister, but she chose not to tell anyone.

Is it true that Ammar loved Nadira or just for Inara? What is the outcome of a love triangle between Ammar, Nadira and Bazli?

Cast Synopsis
Tiz Zaqyah as Dalilah Nadira
Undergo a heart transplant. Bazli's fiancee. Indebted and lived for Bazli. Without realizing it she received Inara's heart, Ammar's lover.

Aqasha as Ammar Zulkarnain
Loyal lover. Loved Inara wholeheartedly. Half his life fly with Inara's death. Discovered Nadira by accident and fell in love with her. Saw Inara's shadows inside Nadira.

Nazim Othman as Bazli Aiman
Nadira's fiance. Loved Nadira so much and willing to sacrifice anything for Nadira. Financed the cost of Nadira's heart transplant surgery.

Aishah Ilias as Inara
Ammar's lover. Loved beauty and nature. Ammar pulse and heart love.

Cast

Main cast
Tiz Zaqyah as Dalilah Nadira
Aqasha as Ammar Zulkarnain
Nazim Othman as Bazli Aiman
Aishah Ilias as Inara

Extended cast
Meor Mohd as Zahir
Sharifah Nadia Yusnita as Yusra
Datin Rebecca Nur Al-Islam as Dalilah Uzma
Datin Fadilah Mansor as Suria
Aida Khalida as Fazeera
Dato' Aziz Singah as Khairudin
Dian P. Ramlee as Norseha
Khaty Azean as Marisa

References

External links
TV3 - Dejavu di Kinabalu

Malaysian drama television series